"Church Call" is a bugle call which signals that religious services are about to begin.  The call may also be used to announce the formation of a funeral escort.

References

Bugle calls